Pharmaceutical manufacturer Deva Holding A.S. is a Turkish Fortune 500 company with annual revenue of more than US$250 million and a staff of approximately 2,300 across its operations in Turkey, Germany, USA and New Zealand.

Background
Established in 1958, Deva Holding A.S. is Turkey’s second largest pharmaceutical company and is primarily engaged in the production and distribution of pharmaceutical and veterinary products.

References

External links
 Deva Pharamaceuticals

Pharmaceutical companies of Turkey